Local elections were held December 14, 1937 in the Philippines. All Philippine women were allowed to vote and elect among them into public offices. One of the famous examples is the election of Carmen Planas as Councilor of the City of Manila.

See also
Commission on Elections
Politics of the Philippines
Philippine elections
President of the Philippines

External links
 The Philippine Presidency Project
 Official website of the Commission on Elections

1937
1937 elections in the Philippines